The Walt Disney World Monorail System is a public transit monorail system in operation at the Walt Disney World Resort in Bay Lake, Florida, near Orlando. The Walt Disney World Resort currently operates twelve Mark VI monorail trains on three lines of service. The monorail system opened in 1971 with two routes (Magic Kingdom: Resort and Express) and with Mark IV monorail trains. It was expanded to three lines (Magic Kingdom: Resort and Express, plus Epcot) in 1982, and the rolling stock was updated to Mark VI trains in 1989.

, the system is one of the most heavily used monorail systems in the world, with over 150,000 daily riders. It is surpassed by the Tokyo Monorail in Tokyo, Japan, which has over 300,000 daily riders; and by the monorail system run by Chongqing Rail Transit in Chongqing, China, which has over 900,000 daily riders on Line 2 and Line 3 combined. The Walt Disney World system nevertheless remains one of the most famous and well-known monorails in the world, along with the Disneyland Monorail System at Disneyland in Anaheim, CA.

Lines, stations, and infrastructure

The Walt Disney World Monorail spans , with around 50 million Disney guests traveling on the monorail each year. The system opened with the rest of the Walt Disney World Resort on October 1, 1971. It initially featured four stations: the Transportation and Ticket Center, Disney's Polynesian Resort, the Magic Kingdom and Disney's Contemporary Resort. The Epcot line and station were added during that park's construction, opening on October 1, 1982. The most recent addition was the Grand Floridian station, which was opened in 1988 along with the resort hotel. Since then, no further additions have been made, and no expansions are planned due to prohibitive construction costs, though a legal easement for monorail construction through Disney's Saratoga Springs Resort & Spa dating back to 1970 still exists.

There are two distinct routes on the monorail system, with three different services:

 Magic Kingdom Express: The Express service runs counter-clockwise around the outer loop, providing nonstop service between the Magic Kingdom and the Transportation and Ticket Center.
 Magic Kingdom Resort: The Resort line runs clockwise around the inner loop, and also services the resorts around the Seven Seas Lagoon with stops at Disney's Contemporary Resort, Disney's Polynesian Village Resort, and Disney's Grand Floridian Resort and Spa.
 Epcot: The Epcot line runs from the Transportation and Ticket Center to Epcot, with trains operating along a single beam on a clockwise loop.

A spur track at Magic Kingdom station connects the Express and Resort lines to the maintenance shop. Another spur connects the Epcot and Express lines and is located northeast of the Transportation and Ticket Center.

The monorail beams, which are made of concrete with a special polystyrene core to lighten their weight, came by train from the state of Washington.

Rolling stock

Specifications

The trains in use since 1989 are Mark VI trains, built by Bombardier Transportation. The trains are driven by eight  motors which are powered by a 600-volt electrical system running through a busbar mounted on each side of the concrete beam. Each train also has seven inverters on board that convert the 600 V DC to 230 V AC for use by the air conditioners and air compressor, and additionally has a battery-backed 37 V DC low-voltage supply that provides power for the train's electronics. The trains are also equipped with a towing knuckle at each end to allow it to be pushed or pulled by a special diesel-powered tractor if need be.

These speed limits are strictly enforced by the train's computer and cannot be overridden without the operator engaging a special lockout. Attempting to drive the train too quickly in a given speed zone will result in an "overspeed stop."

Train spacing is maintained by the Moving Blocklight System (MBS), also known as the MAPO system (for "Mary Poppins," ), which establishes a number of "holdpoints" throughout the system. At any given time, there must be at least two holdpoints between a given train and the train ahead of it. When the train detects that there are fewer than two holdpoints between itself and the preceding train, the emergency brakes are immediately applied and cannot be released until sufficient spacing becomes available or the operator overrides the system. Failure to maintain adequate spacing is known as an "overrun," and is treated as an extremely serious offense.

Below is a list of the models of monorails (and their specifications) that have operated on the Walt Disney World Monorail System:

Automation

Starting June 22, 2014, the monorail began operating on a different timetable in order to accommodate work to automate the system. Disney stated that the system would provide a more efficient service with enhanced safety, as well as more frequent dispatch of the trains, faster switching times, and monorail arrival information. Pilots are still seated in the front cab, but only supervise the monorail in case of an emergency. Platform attendants operate a control panel to dispatch and operate the monorail system.

Identification

Each train is identified by a colored stripe, and given a name according to that color. The complete list of colors used is below:

* Identifiable by deltas.
** Retired following July 2009 incident

To help visually identify Green from Lime, Pink from Coral and Blue from Teal, the Lime, Teal, and Coral stripes have trapezoidal "deltas" within the color stripe in between the passenger doors on each car. Originally, Monorail Lime's deltas (and those of the older Mark IV Lime) were painted a dark blue in homage to the original Walt Disney World monorail cast's costume colors (lime and blue), but the colors were changed when the entire monorail fleet was repainted in the early 2000s. In mid December 2018, Monorail Lime's white delta was repainted to the original dark blue scheme following a refurbishment; these were retained following another refurbishment in 2022. Monorails Coral and Teal have white deltas to differentiate them from Monorails Pink and Blue, respectively. Although Monorail Pink was retired from service following its crash with Monorail Purple in July 2009, Monorail Coral retained its White deltas until October 21, 2021.

In November 2009, Disney put Monorail Teal into service. Monorail Teal was built using the undamaged portions of the two trains involved in the July 5, 2009 crash. The colors of the two trains involved, Pink and Purple, were retired from service. The twelfth train, Peach, was placed into service on October 7, 2011, to restore the resort's fleet back to twelve trains. It was assembled using the undamaged center cars from the Purple train, but with new end cabs replacing the damaged sections from the Pink and Purple trains.

Special liveries
In March 2010, Disney debuted Monorail Coral in TRON livery on the Epcot line as part of a marketing plan for Tron: Legacy.

Since the Tron paint scheme in 2010, there have been several other monorail wraps. On March 31, 2012, Monorail Red was converted into a special scheme commemorating the release of The Avengers, similar to the previous promotion for Tron: Legacy. The monorail ran on the Magic Kingdom line and sometimes on the Resort line as the Epcot line loops through the park itself, since Disney is not able to feature specified Marvel characters inside its Florida parks due to Marvel Entertainment's license agreement with Universal Destinations & Experiences that was in place prior to the purchase of Marvel in 2009.

In March 2013, Monorail Black was given a similar conversion to promote the release of Iron Man 3. In April 2013, Monorail Teal was converted into a special scheme commemorating the release of Monsters University. In November 2015, Monorail Black was decorated in Star Wars designs commemorating the release of Star Wars: Episode VII - The Force Awakens. In February 2016, Monorail Orange was decorated in Zootopia designs and was named the Zootopia Monorail System to reflect the Zootopia Transit Authority, commemorating the release of Zootopia. In June 2018, Monorail Orange was decorated in Incredibles designs to promote the release of Incredibles 2. A year later, Monorail Yellow was decorated with Toy Story characters to promote Toy Story 4. In September 2021, Monorail Gold debuted with a wrap for the Walt Disney World 50th Anniversary.

Refurbishment

Beginning in 2019, all of the monorails were refurbished with new brakes, a new interior, and repainted exterior. Monorails Silver, Green and Black were the first to be refurbished between June and December 2019, and monorail Lime was the last in August 2022. The majority of monorails also had deltas added; it is unknown why this was done, since there are no Monorails that are similarly colored, other than Blue and Teal, and Green and Lime. In December 2022, Monorail Black was repainted with a red pinstripe outline, which it still retains with its new red deltas.

A simpler list of dates is below:
Monorail Silver: Returned on June 30, 2019, with black deltas.
Monorail Green: Returned on October 2, 2019.
Monorail Black: Returned on December 6, 2019, with red deltas.
Monorail Peach: Returned July 14, 2020.
Monorail Blue: Returned on October 29, 2020, with silver deltas.
Monorail Red: Returned on February 12, 2021, with black deltas.
Monorail Orange: Returned on May 17, 2021, with black deltas.
Monorail Gold: Returned on August 15, 2021.
Monorail Coral: Returned on October 21, 2021, with teal deltas. 
Monorail Yellow: Returned on December 15, 2021, with black deltas.
Monorail Teal: Returned on May 28, 2022, with black deltas.
Monorail Lime: Returned on August 11, 2022.

Pre-recorded announcements
The monorail system uses a set of pre-recorded announcements to instruct and entertain passengers. Prior to departure when the pilot closes the doors, an announcement asks guests to "Please stand clear of the doors. Por favor manténganse alejado de las puertas." One of the most well-known phrases within the resort, it was recorded by Jack Wagner, who was known as "the Voice of Disneyland." In 1988 following the construction of the Grand Floridian Resort stop, Kevin Miles replaced Jack Wagner as the voiceover. Wagner can still be heard today as the "Please stand clear of the doors" phrase remains with his voice, partly because it is installed on a separate system. Miles worked in Epcot as part of the 'Voices of Liberty' in the American Adventure pavilion at World Showcase. Sometime before 1998, Disney employee Matt Hanson replaced Kevin Miles, and in 2004 Hanson was replaced by Joe Hursh. Hanson is still with the Walt Disney Company. During the system's early years, the trains featured Wagner's narration of the sights and scenery along the way, as well as information on special events, the resort, and the monorail system itself. On April 13, 2012, at around 5:00 EDT, Disney activated a newer version of the spiel on the monorails that features Tom Kane as its new narrator.

Maintenance

Monorail Shop ("Shop" for short) is Disney's monorail maintenance facility located a short distance northeast of the Magic Kingdom, and provides space for up to ten of the twelve Mark VI trains on its upper level (the bottom level houses the four steam locomotives and trains of the Walt Disney World Railroad in the Magic Kingdom on its west side, and a road vehicle maintenance facility on the east side). On any given night, two to five monorail trains are parked at various stations on the system. On nights where the temperature drops below freezing, two trains will be parked inside the Contemporary Resort; but in practice, trains can be left in any station (even on the express side of a resort station). Trains typically only spend one night out of shop, since routine maintenance is performed nightly. During busy seasons, some trains may be in service for over 24 hours at a time.

It takes anywhere between three and six weeks to paint a monorail train. To access the wheels and underside of the monorail, a portion of Beam 1 inside Shop is removable, primarily used to change load tires.

Severe Weather Protocol
On nights before hurricanes and other severe weather events are predicted to affect the Walt Disney World Resort, three monorails and two service tractors will be left out on the system in case issues occur as a result of the weather. Two trains and a work tractor will be parked inside the Contemporary Resort with the storm doors closed. One train will be parked at Epcot and the work tractor normally stationed on the Epcot Spur will be parked at the Epcot platform of the Transportation and Ticket Center. This way, if any of the switch beams were to go offline, a maintenance team would be able to fix any issues and there would be at least one monorail to transport guests.
Monorail service must cease whenever sustained winds are expected to exceed  or greater.

Towing

The diesel-powered "work tractors" are the tow trucks of the system, and can tow a train to Monorail Shop, located around the bend from Space Mountain. Monorail Operations at the Walt Disney World resort has three separate tractors (Red, tagged '1'; Blue, tagged '2'; and Green, tagged '3') that allow for the simultaneous towing of three different monorails. In the event of a power failure on one of the monorail lines, the tractors are still operational, as they are powered by on-board diesel engines. When not in use, two of the work tractors will usually be parked at the shed while the third is parked on a small  maintenance spur just outside of the Transportation and Ticket Center along the Epcot beam to allow for faster access to any issues on that part of the system.

Safety

Train safety
Safe train spacing is maintained via a moving blocklight system, referred to as MAPO, installed in the cab of each train. MAPO appears in the top center of the pilot's console and looks similar to a horizontal stop light. There are three lights—green, amber, and red—and a push-button labeled "Override". The term "MAPO" itself comes directly from Walt Disney, who formed a new company to deal with Disneyland's transportation system directly from the profits made by Mary Poppins.

Each monorail beam is divided into blocks based upon pylon numbering. The currently illuminated MAPO color indicates how far ahead the leading train is currently located. A green MAPO shows that the leading train is three or more blocks ahead, amber means two blocks ahead, and red indicates that the next train is in the very next block. A block is roughly between 500 and 1000 feet (about 150 and 300 m) long, although this varies. The start of each block is called a "hold point", as pilots may need to hold their trains at that location until the train ahead moves away. Guests riding in the front cab of a monorail can identify hold points by the yellow reflective tape around a pylon's number and by two yellow reflectors attached to the top outside edges of the monorail beam at that pylon.

For safety, trains must be kept at least two blocks apart during normal operation. A red MAPO indicates that train spacing has become unsafe. When a red MAPO occurs, the train's on-board computer locks out the pilot's propulsion control and applies emergency brakes. The pilot cannot resume control of the train until either the MAPO clears or the pilot presses and holds the MAPO override button.

It is the pilot's responsibility to avoid a red MAPO during normal operation. When the MAPO switches from green to amber, this indicates that the monorail is approaching the train ahead. The pilot must stop the train before crossing into the next block of beam way and hence before the MAPO switches to red. Should a pilot cross the hold point and receive a red MAPO, this counts as a safety demerit against the pilot. If a pilot accumulates three demerits on his/her record within a two-year period, then they will be transferred out of the monorails department and into a different role at Walt Disney World.

Safety tests are performed daily to ensure that the MAPO system is working properly on each train. At the direction of the monorail station conducting the test, each train will intentionally overrun a hold point to verify that a red MAPO occurs and that the emergency brakes activate. Pilots perform tests in forward and reverse when bringing a train onto the system for the first time that day. The indications are called into Monorail Central with the emergency brake pressures.

A red MAPO will also occur when the pilot approaches a section of un-powered beam, a spur line, or a switch beam thrown in the direction of a spur line. Pilots must engage the MAPO override when moving trains through a switch to the spur line. Red MAPOs occurring due to safety tests, switching, or beam power loss do not count as demerits against the pilot.

COVID-19 precautions
During the COVID-19 pandemic, Walt Disney World installed plastic dividers to the monorail to isolate guests from potential exposure to COVID-19 and to safely increase monorail capacity. The dividers were placed into four sections capable of sitting about two adults. The plastic was made up of material that was modified to fit onto the existing handrails with zip-ties.

Emergency evacuation
Emergencies requiring train evacuation will be handled differently depending upon the location of the train and the nature of the emergency.

If a train is stopped at a station platform or at the work platform along the Epcot beam, guests can exit the train onto the platform. Exiting a train is possible even when the doors of the train cars are closed. The large rectangular window in the middle of each car is an emergency exit and can be removed from the interior of the car. A cast member outside the car can also manually open the rightmost door panel of the car by releasing the air pressure holding that panel closed. The air pressure release is a handle beneath the rectangular center window that is similar in appearance to a car door handle.

If a train is stopped on an open beam, then guests evacuate through emergency exits located in the roof of the train. Guests open roof hatches by first removing decorative plastic from the ceiling above a bulkhead footstool and then by lifting open a hinged hatch that will flip across the bulkhead dividing two train cars. Guests evacuate to the roof by climbing through the open hatch onto the top of the train. The bulkheads separating cars are designed as firewalls that will contain a fire within a car to just that car. The open hatch allows guests in the affected car to transfer to an adjacent car where they can safely wait for evacuation by fire response crews.

If the emergency affects the entire train, then guests are evacuated to the surface of the beam. Guests again open the emergency roof hatches, but do not simply move to the adjacent car. Instead, they use a small handrail present along the top of each train car to move all the way to the front of the train. The train's pilot can attach a knotted rope to both the top and the base of the windscreen, and guests use the rope to shimmy down the windscreen to the surface of the beam. They finally start walking along the beam away from the train.

Reedy Creek Emergency Services provides fire response and rescue for the Walt Disney World Monorail System and maintains an all-wheel-drive fire truck specially designed for monorail rescue.

Security checks
Since April 2017, bag searches and walk through metal detector checks have been systematically performed on guests before they board the monorail, including at the Transportation and Ticket Center and the three resort monorail stops. The security cordon extension was put in place to reduce congestion at the entrance to Magic Kingdom. Until late 2019, guests taking the monorail to Epcot would need to go through security again at the Epcot entrance, but this was eventually fixed in late 2019 by the relocation of Epcot's main entrance checkpoints.

Platform safety

The Express station at the Transportation and Ticket Center, and both stations at the Magic Kingdom have remotely opened or automated gates that bar riders from approaching the guideway (and, thus, any approaching or departing train) until the operators have determined that it is safe to allow people to board the train. The cast member at the station gives the riders instructions on how to board. The other stations have manually operated gates to serve this function.

All platforms are ADA-accessible. Because the train level is higher than the platform level, a portable ramp must be used to load and unload guests with disabilities at all stations. For many years, the Contemporary Resort station did not have ADA access, but an elevator has since been added to the platform.

Incidents

Several accidents and injuries have occurred on the monorails since Walt Disney World opened, as well as one death. On July 5, 2009, a driver was killed after the Pink and Purple monorails collided on the Epcot line at the Transportation and Ticket Center. This was the only fatal incident on the Walt Disney World Monorail System in its history.

Before July 2009, Disney would allow up to four guests to sit in the front of the monorail with the pilot. This was offered on a first-come, first-served basis, and a pilot gave out "co-pilot licenses" at the end of the journey. After the July 5, 2009 crash, Disney indefinitely suspended the co-pilot program. Pilots will still allow guests to tour the cab while parked at a station. Since the automation of all trains, one of the front passenger seats was removed to add computer housings for the automation system.

On November 18, 2015, Monorail Coral collided with a tow tractor. The incident happened on the Express loop between TTC and the Contemporary Resort. It is reported that Monorail Coral was being towed by the tractor when they became separated. It is unknown how they became separated but the resulting collision cased damage to Monorail Coral's nose cone and the tractor. This incident happened outside of public operation and subsequently no passengers were aboard at the time. The monorail system was closed until  Monorail Coral and the tractor was recovered, returning to normal operation a day later on November 19, 2015.

On the night of January 27, 2023, the monorail system temporarily went of service due to a power outage, but would later return to service the next day in the late afternoon.

See also

Disney Transport
Disney Resort Line (monorail system at Tokyo Disney Resort)
Disneyland Monorail System (monorail system at Disneyland)
Disneyland Resort line (mass transit rail system at Hong Kong Disneyland Resort)

List of monorail systems
Rail transport in Walt Disney Parks and Resorts

References

External links 

Walt Disney World Monorail System - WDWMagic.com (Unofficial WDW Site)

Monorails
Alweg people movers
Zero-fare transport services
Monorails in the United States
1971 establishments in Florida
Passenger rail transportation in Florida
Rail transport in Walt Disney Parks and Resorts
Railroads of amusement parks in the United States
Railway lines opened in 1971
Rapid transit in Florida
Monorail System